In geology, the frost line is the level down to which the soil will normally freeze each winter. By an analogy, the term is introduced in other areas.

Frost line (astrophysics), a particular distance in the solar nebula from the central protosun where it is cool enough for hydrogen compounds such as water, ammonia, and methane to condense into solid ice grains. 
Frost line (polymers) in polymer film manufacturing, a notion related to physical changes from melt into solid film during extrusion.

See also

 
 
 
 
 Snow line
 Frost (disambiguation)
 Line (disambiguation)